Cuspidaria is a genus of bivalves in the family Cuspidariidae.

Species 
 Cuspidaria abbreviata (Forbes, 1843)
 Cuspidaria alternata (d'Orbigny, 1842)
 Cuspidaria apodema Dall, 1916
 Cuspidaria arctica (Sars, 1878)
 Cuspidaria arcuata Dall, 1881
 Cuspidaria atlantica
 Cuspidaria aupouria Dell, 1950
 Cuspidaria chilensis Dall, 1890
 Cuspidaria circinata Jeffreys, 1876
 Cuspidaria costellata (Deshayes, 1833)
 Cuspidaria cuspidata (Olivi, 1792)
 Cuspidaria elegans (Hinds, 1843)
 Cuspidaria exigua (Jeffreys, 1876)
 Cuspidaria fairchildi Suter, 1908
 Cuspidaria filatovae
 Cuspidaria formosa Verrill and Bush, 1893
 Cuspidaria fraterna Verrill and Bush, 1893
 Cuspidaria gigantea Verrill, 1884
 Cuspidaria glacialis (G. O. Sars, 1878)
 Cuspidaria jeffreysi (Dall, 1881)
 Cuspidaria jugosa (S. V. Wood, 1856)
 Cuspidaria kawamurai Kuroda, 1948
 Cuspidaria kyushuensis Okutani, 1962 
 Cuspidaria media A. E. Verrill and Bush, 1898
 Cuspidaria microrhina Dall, 1886
 Cuspidaria morelandi Dell, 1956   
 Cuspidaria morioria Dell, 1956 
 Cuspidaria nobilis (Adams, 1864)
 Cuspidaria obesa (Loven, 1846)
 Cuspidaria parapodema Bernard, 1969
 Cuspidaria parkeri
 Cuspidaria parva
 Cuspidaria pellucida Stimpson, 1853
 Cuspidaria rostrata (Spengler, 1793)
 Cuspidaria subglacialis Dall, 1913
 Cuspidaria subtorta (Sars, 1878)
 Cuspidaria subtorte (Sars, 1878)
 Cuspidaria sulcifera (Jeffreys, 1882)
 Cuspidaria tomricei Poppe & Tagaro, 2016
 Cuspidaria trailli (Hutton, 1873) 
 Cuspidaria tuhua Dell, 1962
 Cuspidaria turgida Verrill and Bush, 1898
 Cuspidaria undata Verrill, 1884
 Cuspidaria variola
 Cuspidaria ventricosa Verrill and Bush, 1898
 Cuspidaria vicdani Poppe & Tagaro, 2016
 Cuspidaria willetti Fleming, 1948
 Cuspidaria wollastoni E. A. Smith, 1885

 Fossil species
 Cuspidaria inflata (Jeffreys, 1876) and Cuspidaria lamellosa Sars, 1878 from the London Clay, a marine geological formation of Ypresian (Lower Eocene Epoch, c. 56–49 Ma)
 Cuspidaria textorama Garvie 2013, from the Eocene of the Reklaw Formation in the United States

References

External links 
 

Cuspidariidae
Bivalve genera
Extant Eocene first appearances